Davangere benne dose or Butter Dose is a type of dosa which traces its origin from the city of Davanagere in Karnataka, India. The term "benne dose" in English language simply corresponds to butter dose. It is prepared by addition of generous amount of butter while preparing the normal dosa, and accompanied by coconut chutney. Its batter is very different comprising a mixture of rice, dal, puffed rice, etc. and is prepared on wood fired pan. It is similar to masala dosa or set dosa but smaller in size, made out of rice batter and much more butter. It is served with liberal helpings of butter sprinkled on it.

Some of the variants of the benne dose:
 Benne khali Dosa
 Benne open dosa
 Benne masala dosa

History
Davanagere Benne Dose has an interesting history dated from 1928.  A lady by name Chennamma migrated to Davanagere with her children and started preparing Dosa, Chutney and Potato Palya with her own unique recipe.  She started her tiny eatery in front of Savalagi Drama Theater near Vasantha Talkies at Davanagere which became popular for its taste.

Initially she used to prepare Dosa with Ragi batter.  Later by 1938, her children started preparing Dosa with Rice batter, puffed rice, dal with generous dollops of butter.  This became extremely popular with locals very soon. This was carried on by Chennamma's two sons Shanthappa and Mahadevappa.  They both opened their own eateries.  

Shanthappa opened his own eatery in 1944 called "Shantappa Dosa Hotel" and this is the oldest Benne Dose eatery of Davanagere located near Clock tower in Old Davanagere.  This is presently run by his son Ganesh.   

Mahadevappa opened his eatery near Vasantha theatre which does not exist today.  His elder son Ravi has a Benne Dose eatery on Church Road as Ravi benne dose hotel.  His younger son Viji also has his own Vijji Benne Dosa eatery at dental college road.

Apart from these, there are many popular eateries serving delicious Benne Dosa in Davanagere.  Popular amongst them are Sri. Guru Kottureshwara Benne Dosa Hotel, Gayathri Benne Dosa Hotel, Vasantha Benne Dosa Hotel, etc.,
As there are no patent issues anybody can make Benne Dosa and sell it. Benne Dosa or Davanagere Benne Dosa is a popular food item in many hotels across karnataka. What really matters is the taste.

Gallery

See also
 Cuisine of Karnataka
List of Indian breads

References

See also
 Cuisine of Karnataka

Karnataka cuisine
Indian breads
Unleavened breads
Dosa
Davangere